Rutman is a surname. Notable people with the surname include:

 Darrett B. Rutman (1929–1997), American historian.
 Heather Rutman, American blogger.
 Leo Rutman, American writer and playwright.
 Robert Rutman (1931–2021), German-American visual artist, musician, composer, and instrument builder.
 Raphael Rutman, Rabbi.